Sleepeezee is a British manufacturer of mattresses situated in Kent. It has a Royal Warrant of Appointment for its products. Travelodge UK feature their mattresses.

History

Ownership
In 1964 it was bought by the Simmons Bedding Company, and moved its premises. It was owned by Cauval Group of France (who made the Cumfilux brand) as part of Continental Sleep Holdings from the early 1990s when it bought the company for £17m, but went into receivership in February 2016, and is now owned by Adova Group, funded by Perceva.

Royal Warrant
It received a Royal Warrant to the Queen in 1963. In 1985 it received a Royal Warrant to the Prince of Wales.

Structure
It is a member of the National Bed Federation. It makes its mattresses in Strood.

References

External links
Official Website

British companies established in 1924
British Royal Warrant holders
Companies based in Kent
Furniture companies of England
Manufacturing companies established in 1924
Mattress retailers of the United Kingdom
Medway
British furniture makers